Joysagar Tank, also known as Joysagar Borpukhuri is a large tank located at Sivasagar district, Assam, India. The lake is 5 km from the center of the Sivasagar town. The lake has historical significance.

History 

The lake was made during the reign of the renowned Ahom king, Rudra Singha. About 5 km from the Sivasagar township, three set of temples are located on the northern bank of the lake. The most renowned among these sanctuaries is the Joy dol, which is also known as the Keshavnaryan Vishu dol. As the name recommends, the sanctuary is devoted to Lord Vishnu and his numerous manifestations. This lake was formed on 1697, in just 45 days. The lake was made in the memory of Joymoti Konwari, mother of Rudra Singha. The lake covers area of 318 acres (1.28 square km). The water level of the lake is 14 feet higher from ground level.

Tourism 
The lake attracts international tourists. The northern bank of the lake has many temples which are visited by the locals every day. Joysagar is one of the most famous tourist attractions of Sivasagar and is visited by people in large numbers. During winters, Joysagar lake becomes home to hundreds of migratory birds. During this time bird watching is an important activity.

See also 

 List of lakes in India
 List of lakes of Assam
 Sivasagar Tank (Borpukhuri)

References 

Lakes of Assam
Tourism in Northeast India
Sivasagar district